Anthony Cavalero (born October 14, 1983) is an American actor and comedian. He is known for his role as Dewey Finn on the Nickelodeon's School of Rock, Keefe Chambers on the HBO television series The Righteous Gemstones (2019–present), and for playing Ozzy Osbourne in the film The Dirt.

Early life
Cavalero was born in Northern Virginia, not far from Washington, DC.  He attended Poe Middle School and graduated from Annandale High School, where he lettered in varsity football, wrestling and lacrosse. He is an Eagle Scout and a Black Belt in Tae Kwon Do. He is a graduate of Virginia Military Institute where he was a four-year varsity lacrosse player. He moved to Los Angeles in 2006 and studied theater at CalStLA. He is a main company member of The Groundlings.

Career
Cavalero began acting in 2006. In 2014, he was cast as Dewey Finn on the Nickelodeon remake of School of Rock, replacing Jack Black from the original 2003 film. The series premiered in 2016 and ran for three seasons.

In 2018, he was cast as Ozzy Osbourne in Netflix's biography film of Mötley Crüe, The Dirt.

In 2019, Cavalero was cast in HBO comedy The Righteous Gemstones as Keefe Chambers.

Filmography

Television

Film

References

External links

1983 births
Living people
American male television actors
Male actors from Los Angeles
21st-century American male actors
Annandale High School alumni